What Color Is Your Sky is a studio album recorded by American country singer Jason Michael Carroll. Released on May 4, 2015, via Malaco Records/For the Lonely Records, it is Carroll's fourth studio album.

Background
Carroll started a Kickstarter campaign to help pay the cost of the album's recording in early 2014, the goal was to raise $40,000 but with help of fans Carroll raised over $70,000 by fans to album pay the album's production costs.

He released the lead single on March 17, 2015, titled "God Only Knows", he also announced his new album would be titled What Color Is Your Sky and would be released May 4, 2015.
'''The Color of the Sky appears blue to the human eye but really the color of the sky is really purple and black also at night the sky my look just black but really there is a great amount of purple there just hiding.

Track listing

Personnel
 Bob Beech - harmonica
 Jason Michael Carroll - acoustic guitar, drum loops, lead vocals, background vocals
 Andrew Dickson - drums
 Damian Martin - acoustic guitar, electric guitar
 Blake Padilla - keyboards, synthesizer, background vocals
 Cole Phillips - acoustic guitar, electric guitar
 Richie Scholl - acoustic guitar, electric guitar
 Shaun Smith - bass guitar, background vocals
 J.T. Spangler - background vocals
 Chris Young - acoustic guitar, electric guitar

Charts
The album debuted on Top Country Albums chart at No. 37, selling 1,100 copies in the US for the week.

References

2015 albums
Jason Michael Carroll albums